The following lists events that happened during 2010 in Kyrgyzstan.

Events

April

 April 6 - Hundreds of protesters seize a government office in Bishkek to request the resignition of Kurmanbek Bakiyev after battling flashbangs and lachrymators. A local governor is taken hostage by protesters. Hundreds surround police HQ. Almazbek Atambayev is seized by police. There are riots in Talas.
 April 7 - Kyrgyz Revolution of 2010
 President Kurmanbek Bakiyev reportedly flees the country, as the government steps down and protestors overrun the parliament building. The opposition announces the formation of a new provisional government headed by Roza Otunbayeva.
 President Kurmanbek Bakiyev makes a last-ditch attempt to quell the riots by imposing a curfew as six people reportedly die.
 Protesters seize the state television channel building in the capital, Bishkek. Kyrgyz opposition representatives and human rights activists appear on the TV channel KTR which resumes broadcasting after one hour.
 Interior Minister Moldomusa Kongantiyev is reported to have been killed after being taken hostage by opposition protesters inside an interior department building in the northern city of Talas.
 April 8 - Kyrgyz Revolution of 2010
 100 people die in anti-government protests in Kyrgyzstan, according to opposition activist Toktoim Umetalieva.
 The Kyrgyzstan government is ousted as the result of the popular revolt.
 Opposition leader Roza Otunbayeva says she will lead a temporary government for six months.
 President Kurmanbek Bakiyev escapes Bishkek, purportedly to a southern region of the country through Osh. He refuses to resign, but admits he has lost control of the Kyrgyz military.

 
Years of the 21st century in Kyrgyzstan
2010s in Kyrgyzstan
Kyrgyzstan
Kyrgyzstan